Leptoseps poilani is a species of skink found in Vietnam.

Taxonomy
It was first formally named by René Léon Bourret in 1937 as Siaphos poilani. The specific name poilani is in honor of  French botanist Eugène Poilane (1887–1964).

References

Leptoseps
Reptiles described in 1937
Taxa named by René Léon Bourret